Agbe is the main locality of the Tanqua Millash district of the Tigray Region of Ethiopia. The municipality (tabia) centre is in Sele town. Until January 2020, Agbe belonged to the Abergele district.

Geography 
The tabia occupies the southwestern footslopes of the Degua Tembien massif.

Geology 

From the higher to the lower locations, the following geological formations are present:
 Antalo Limestone
 Adigrat Sandstone
 Edaga Arbi Glacials

Springs 
As there are no permanent rivers, the presence of springs is of utmost importance for the local people. The main springs in the tabia are may Hitsare and Ayni Sele they are in Agbe, where construction works for a soft drinks factory have been started.

Settlements 
The tabia centre Sele holds a few administrative offices, a health post, a primary school, and some small shops. There are a few more primary schools across the tabia. The main other populated places are:
 Agbe
 Kalazban
 Ch’ekh
 Milehay Mereu 
 Meserete Birhan 
 Babdre
 Enda Abune Hawarya 
 Deleq 
 Sheka ( shagla Muren)
 Gereb Giba 
 Shewuate Hugum 
 Adi Wahro
 Majur
 Shekah Fuqur 
 Adi Siera 
 Adi Qeley 
 Adenna 
 Adi Nifas 
 Hadush Adi
 Jibare 
 Zuqli
 Menew
 Yeresere
 Enda Maryam Qorar
 Kerene
 Dawusra 
 kamshana 
 Seyemtirba

Economy and livelihood 
The population lives essentially from crop farming, supplemented with off-season work in nearby towns. The farmers have adapted their cropping systems to the spatio-temporal variability in rainfall. In a certain way, there is irrigation of various fruits and peppers in “Shekah” irrigation with water from both sources Hitsare and  Ayni Sele springs  

Historically Friday was the Market day of Agbe but  Since 2004, it has been changed to Saturday by order of the local administration this day Saturday is the market day.

History and culture

History 
The history of the tabia is strongly confounded with the history of Tembien.

Religion and churches 
Agbe is the birthplace of Ligaba Guangul Riese, who was the palace protocol of Emperor Yohannes IV.
Children: Degezmati Gebremedhn Guangul  and Degezmati Seyoum Guangul 
Grand Children: Fitawurari Girmay and Fitawurari Yohannes 

Agbe is surrounded by many ancient monasteries including Qeqema Maryam, Chikh Selassie, and Mennewe Libanos

Most inhabitants are Orthodox Christians.

Roads and communication 
The main road Mekelle – Hagere Selam – Abiy Addi runs through the centre of the tabia. There are regular bus services to these towns.

Tourism 
Its mountainous nature and proximity to Mekelle makes the tabia fit for tourism.

Trekking routes 

Trekking routes have been established in this tabia. The tracks are not marked on the ground but can be followed using downloaded .GPX files.
 Trek 8, is from Agbe to Kemishana, and further across May Selelo and Zikuli Rivers, along gorges and Zeyi cave to Inda Maryam Qorar
 Trek 19, from Sele to Debre Sema'it, and then it continues to Inda Maryam Qorar
Both treks involve a vertical interval of more than one kilometer and require good physical conditions.

Accommodation and facilities 
Though facilities are basic, the inhabitants are hospitable.

References 

Populated places in the Tigray Region